Benger may refer to:

Places 
 Benger, Western Australia
 Benger Swamp, Western Australia
 Sutton Benger, Wiltshire, England

People 
 Elizabeth Benger (1775–1827), English biographer, novelist and poet
 John Benger (born 1959), British official and Clerk of the House of Commons
 John Benger (politician) (died ), English politician
 Richard Benger, 16th-century English canon law jurist and Vice-Chancellor of the University of Oxford
 Thomas Benger ( – 1577), Master of the Revels under Queen Elizabeth I of England
 William Benger (1894–1917), British flying ace